Antigua and Barbuda competed at the 2007 World Championships in Athletics with 2 athletes.

Competitors

Men

References

Nations at the 2007 World Championships in Athletics
World Championships in Athletics
Antigua and Barbuda at the World Championships in Athletics